Parkside Academy (formerly Parkside School and then Parkside Sports College), is a coeducational secondary school with academy status, located in Hall Lane Estate, Willington, Crook, County Durham, England.

Parkside teaches a wide range of standard, and specialist curriculum subjects as well as a multitude of after school activities. It is a well known community association and hosts a state of the art Gym and activities for youths under 16. The school specializes in Information Technology and Physical Education.

External links
Parkside Academy official website

Secondary schools in County Durham
Academies in County Durham